A reconfigurable manufacturing system (RMS) is one designed at the outset for rapid change in its structure, as well as its hardware and software components, in order to quickly adjust its production capacity and functionality within a part family in response to sudden market changes or intrinsic system change.

From 1996 to 2007 Yoram Koren received an NSF grant of $32.5 million  to develop the RMS science-base and its software and hardware tools, which were implemented in the automotive, aerospace, and engine factories.

The term reconfigurability in manufacturing was likely coined by Kusiak and Lee.

The RMS, as well as one of its components—the reconfigurable machine tool (RMT)—were invented in 1998 in the Engineering Research Center for Reconfigurable Manufacturing Systems (ERC/RMS) at the University of Michigan College of Engineering. The RMS goal is summarized by the statement: "Exactly the capacity and functionality needed, exactly when needed".

Ideal reconfigurable manufacturing systems possess six core RMS characteristics: modularity, integrability, customized flexibility, scalability, convertibility, and diagnosability. A typical RMS will have several of these characteristics, though not necessarily all. When possessing these characteristics, RMS increases the speed of responsiveness of manufacturing systems to unpredicted events, such as sudden market demand changes or unexpected machine failures.. The RMS facilitates a quick production launch of new products, and allows for adjustment of production quantities that might unexpectedly vary. The ideal reconfigurable system provides exactly the functionality and production capacity needed, and can be economically adjusted exactly when needed. These systems are designed and operated according to Yoram Koren's RMS principles.

The components of RMS are CNC machines, reconfigurable machine tools, reconfigurable inspection machines and material transport systems (such as gantries and conveyors) that connect the machines to form the system. Different arrangements and configurations of these machines will affect the system's productivity. A collection of mathematical tools, which are defined as the RMS science base, may be utilized to maximize system productivity with the smallest possible number of machines.

Rationale for RMS 
Globalization has created a new landscape for industry, one of fierce competition, short windows of market opportunity, and frequent changes in product demand. This change presents both a threat and an opportunity. To capitalize on the opportunity, industry needs to possess manufacturing systems that can produce a wide range of products within a product family. That range must meet the requirements of multiple countries and various cultures, not just one regional market. A design for the right mix of products must be coupled with the technical capabilities that allow for quick changeover of product mix and quantities that might vary dramatically, even on a monthly basis. Reconfigurable manufacturing systems have these capabilities.

RMS System Architecture and Operation 
The system architecture of a typical RMS is shown below. 

The system is composed of stages: 10, 20, 30, 40, etc. Each stage consists of identical machines, such as CNC milling machines, or RMT machines. The system produces one product, for example, an automotive engine block or a cylinder head. The manufactured product moves on the horizontal conveyor. Then Gantry-10 grips the product and brings it to one of CNC-10. When CNC-10 finishes the processing, Gantry-10 moves it back to the conveyor. The conveyor moves the product to Gantry-20, which grips the product and load it on the RMT-20, and so on. Inspection machines are placed at several stages, and at the end of the manufacturing system. 

RMS is defined as a “system designed at the outset for rapid changes in its structure.” In practice this feature is implemented by designing an open space with an access to the gantry at each stage. These spaces enable matching rapidly higher market demand by adding machines in these spaces, which increases production rate to match the demand.  

The product may move during its production in many production paths. Three paths are shown in the figure. Although the CNC machines at each stage are identical, in practice there are small variations in the precision of identical machines, which create accumulated errors in the manufactured product. The magnitude of the error depends on the path in which the product moved; each path has its own “stream-of-variations” (a term coined by Y. Koren).

RMS characteristics 
Ideal reconfigurable manufacturing systems possess six core characteristics: modularity, integrability, customized flexibility, scalability, convertibility, and diagnosability. These characteristics, which were introduced by professor Yoram Koren in 1995, apply to the design of whole manufacturing systems, as well as to some of its components: reconfigurable machines, their controllers, and system control software.
Modularity refers to the modules that reconfigurable manufacturing systems consist of.  At the system level the machines are modules. At the machine level the axes of motion are modules (see the RMT Figure). The system control may be composed of control modules. Modules are easier to maintain and update.

Integrability is the ability to rapidly integrate modules by mechanical, informational, and control interfaces that enable module integration and communication.  At the system level the machines are the modules that are integrated via material transport systems (such as conveyors and gantries) to form a reconfigurable manufacturing system.

Customization allows the design of system flexibility just around a product family, obtaining thereby customized-flexibility, as opposed to the general flexibility of FMS. Customization allows a reduction in the investment cost without sacrificing performance.

Convertibility is the ability to easily transform the functionality of existing systems, machines, or controls to suit new production requirements. Examples included changing a machine in the system to another type of machine to respond to  a new required functionality, or  switching spindles on a milling machine (e.g., from low-torque high-speed spindle for aluminum to high-torque low-speed spindle for titanium).

Scalability is the ability to easily change production capacity by adding (or reducing) manufacturing resources. Scalability of a manufacturing system is increased by adding machines to expand the system production rate to match a sudden market growth. Adding machines requires extending the reach of the station gantries.

Diagnosability is the ability to automatically detect and diagnose the source of the manufactured product quality or precision defects. This automatic diagnosis  allows rapid correction of the defects. The RMS must be designed with product inspection machines embedded at optimal locations in the system.

RMS principles 
Reconfigurable manufacturing systems operate according to a set of basic principles formulated by professor Yoram Koren and are called Koren's RMS principles. The more of these principles applicable to a given manufacturing system, the more reconfigurable is that system. The RMS principles are:

 The RMS is designed for adjustable production resources to respond to imminent needs.
 The RMS capacity is rapidly scalable in small, optimal increments.
 The RMS functionality is rapidly adaptable to the production of new products.
 To enhance the speed of responsiveness of a manufacturing system, core RMS characteristics should be embedded in the whole system as well as in its components (mechanical, communications and controls).
 The RMS is designed around a part family, with just enough customized flexibility needed to produce all parts in that family.
 The RMS contains an economic equipment mix of flexible machines (e.g., CNC), reconfigurable machine tools, reconfigurable inspection machines, and reconfigurable assembly stations.
 The RMS possesses hardware and software capabilities to cost-effectively respond to unpredictable events—both external (market changes) and intrinsic events (machine failure).

RMS and FMS 
Reconfigurable manufacturing systems (RMS) and flexible manufacturing systems (FMS) have different goals. FMS aims at increasing the variety of parts produced. RMS aims at increasing the speed of responsiveness to market changes and customer's demand. RMS is also flexible, but only to a limited extent—its flexibility is confined to only that necessary to produce a part family. This is the "customized flexibility" or the customization characteristic, which is not the general flexibility that FMS offers. The customized flexibility enables higher production rates.  Other important advantages of RMS are rapid scalability to the desired volume, and convertibility, which are obtained within reasonable cost to manufacturers. The best application of FMS is found in production of small sets of products [see Wikipedia].

RMS science base 
The RMS technology is based on a systematic approach to the design and operation of reconfigurable manufacturing systems. The approach consists of key elements, the compilation of which is called the RMS science base.  These elements are summarized below.
 Given a part family, desired volume, and mix, a system-level process planner can suggest alternative system configurations and compare their productivity, part quality, convertibility, and scalability options. It can perform automatic system balancing based on Genetic Algorithm and statistics.  Useful software packages to perform these tasks are PAMS and SHARE.
 A life-cycle economic modeling methodology, based on blending dynamic programming with option theory, recommends the system that will be optimally profitable during its lifetime.
 A reconfigurable machine tool (RMT) design methodology allows machines to be systematically designed, starting from the features of a family of parts to be machined. A new arch-type RMT, which has been designed and built at the ERC/RMS in Michigan, forms the basis for a new direction in machine research.
 A logic control design methodology for sequencing and coordination control of large manufacturing systems results in reconfigurable and formally verifiable controllers that can be implemented on industrial PLCs.
 A Stream-of-Variations (SoV) methodology based on blending state-space control theory with in-process statistics forms a new theoretical approach for systematic ramp-up after reconfiguration, which results in substantial time-to-market reduction.
 A machine vision algorithm integrated into the reconfigurable inspection station to inspect surface porosity defects (installed at General Motors Flint Engine Plant).

See also
 Modular design

References

Manufacturing
Modular design